Miss Europe 1980 was the 40th edition of the Miss Europe pageant and the 29th edition under the Mondial Events Organization. It was held at Puerto de la Cruz Park in Santa Cruz of Tenerife, Canary Islands, Spain on March 2, 1980. Karin Zorn of Austria, was crowned Miss Europe 1980 by out going titleholder Eva Maria Düringer of Austria.

Results

Placements

Special awards

Contestants 

 - Karin Zorn
 - Christine Linda Bernadette Cailliau
 - Lone Gladys Jørgensen
 - Tracey Jessop
 - Päivi Uitto
 - Sylvie Hélène Marie Parera
 - Andrea Hontschik
 - Mika Dimitropoulou
 - Marlene Vermeulen
 - Kristín Bernharðsdóttir
 - Maura McMenamim
 - Franca Filone
 - Brenda de Bono
 - Anette Stai
 - Lorraine Davidson
 - María Dolores "Lola" Forner Toro
 - Christina Bolinder
 - Birgit Krahl
 - Serap Yalçın
 - Janet Beverly Hobson

Notes

Returns

Withdrawals
 - Constantia Christodoulidou (Kostandino Christodoulidou)

References

External links 
 

Miss Europe
1980 beauty pageants
1980 in Spain